Maurice 'Moe' Lee (born 1980) is former indoor football wide receiver.

Early life
He attended South High School where he was an option quarterback who was rated the number one athlete in the state of Ohio and one of the top recruits in the nation, the 5-foot-9, 185-pound Lee was recruited to Ohio State as a receiver. He played for the Buckeyes from 1999 to 2003. In that time he was tossed back-and-forth from receiver to defensive back.

College career

2003 Media Guide: Maurice “Moe” Lee is a reserve wide receiver with outstanding quickness and speed … appeared briefly in the Kent State and San Jose State games last year, but did not have any receptions … talented athlete who plays on the special teams … has seen action in eight games as a Buckeye.

2002 Season: Moved back to wide receiver after a year at cornerback.

2002 Media Guide: Moves back to wide receiver this year after a year at cornerback … talented athlete with outstanding speed and quickness … has been compared to former OSU standout
Terry Glenn in terms of talent, but up to this point has not shown the consistency the coaching staff is looking for … has the athletic ability to make a name for himself on the special teams and will get every chance to do just that in the fall … sat out two seasons because of academics, so last year was an adjustment for him.

2001 Season: Reserve cornerback and member of the special teams … saw brief action in six games and had one tackle (against Akron) … came to Ohio State as a wide receiver, but was moved to cornerback in the spring.

2001 Media Guide: Moe Lee is one of the more interesting stories of spring ball … started out the spring at wide receiver but then flip-flopped with cornerback Bam Childress two-thirds of the way through spring practice and made an immediate impact at cornerback (as Childress did at receiver) … very much in contention for a starting spot on the right side … coaches like his competitive attitude, quick feet, quickness and cover ability … seems to have an instinctive knack for coverage and could be a diamond in the rough … sat out the past two seasons, but showed no signs of the layoff in the spring.

2000 Season: Did not play due to academic problems.

2000 Media Guide: Did not play last year because of academic deficiencies but is eligible to play this fall … coaches are anxious to see him in action … a high school quarterback, he will be a wide receiver for OSU … exciting athlete with tremendous quickness and cat-quick moves … will get a long, hard look in the fall … had 1,600 all-purpose yards as a senior, rushing for 500 yards, throwing for 750 and accounting for another 460 in receiving yardage … had even better numbers as a junior, accounting for 2,200 all-purpose yards, including 1,030 rushing … ranked as the No. 1 athlete in the state by the Ohio Football Recruiting News … the son of Diane Lee.

1999 Media Guide: High school option quarterback who was recruited as a wide receiver … had 500 passing yards and 750 rushing yards as a senior and caught 18 passes for an additional 426 yards … had over 2,200 all-purpose yards as a junior, including 1,030 rushing yards … No. 9 rated player in the Midwest by the Detroit Free Press … Ranked as the No. 1 “athlete” in the state by The Ohio Football Recruiting News entering his senior year … No. 15 prospect in the state by Bill Kurelic … The son of Diane Lee

Lee was a part of the 2002 National Championship team at Ohio State University.   He has a B.A. in education/sports and leisure studies, 2004. He also received his master's degree in sport management, fall 2011.

Professional career

Dayton Warbirds
In 2005, Lee signed to play for the Dayton Warbirds and led the NIFL in all purpose yards and was a first team All-Star selection.

Miami Valley Silverbacks
Lee also grabbed first team All-Star selections in the AIFA and the AIFL.  As a member of the Silverbacks in 2006, Lee broke the league's single game record for receptions, yards, and touchdown receptions.  Moe had 15 catches for 191 yards and 6 touchdowns to set the record.  Later that season he broke his own records with 17 catches for 197 yards and 7 touchdowns.  Lee finished the season with 90 catches for 1,385 yards and 29 touchdowns and was voted to the All-Star Team.

Cincinnati Commandos
On December 28, 2010, it was announced that Lee had come out of his year off and signed with the Cincinnati Commandos of the CIFL. Lee went on to play in 4 games and collected 13 catches, for 216 yards and 4 touchdowns.

References

1980 births
Living people
Players of American football from Cleveland
Cincinnati Commandos players
Dayton Sharks players
Marion Mayhem players
Dayton Warbirds players
Ohio State Buckeyes football players